Mid Armagh may refer to:

The central part of County Armagh
Mid Armagh (Northern Ireland Parliament constituency)
Mid Armagh (UK Parliament constituency)